Zombori is a surname. Notable people with the surname include:

Gábor Zombori (born 2002), Hungarian swimmer
Ödön Zombori (1907–1989), Hungarian wrestler
Sándor Zombori (born 1951), Hungarian footballer
Vilmos Zombori (1906–1993), Romanian footballer
Zalán Zombori (born 1975), Hungarian footballer, son of Sándor